The 2010-11 NBL season was the 33rd for the Wollongong Hawks in the NBL.

Off-season

Additions

Subtractions

The Hawks also managed to retain eight members from last years squad: Mat Campbell, Glen Saville, Daniel Jackson, Larry Davidson, Rhys Martin, Tim Coenraad, Tim Behrendorff, and David Gruber. Development player Zac Delaney was also retained for this season.

Roster

Depth chart  

* = Developmental Player (may only participate in Home games)

Regular season

Standings

Game log

|- style="background-color:#bbffbb;"
| 1
| 20 August
| University of Hartford
| W 84-63
|  
| 
| 
| Illawarra Basketball Stadium
| 1–0
|- style="background-color:#bbffbb;"
| 2
| 3 September
| Sydney
| W 86-80
|  
| 
| 
| Illawarra Basketball Stadium
| 2–0

|- style="background-color:#bbffbb;"
| 1
| 15 October
| Gold Coast
| W 83-77
| Gary Ervin (27) 
| Glen Saville (8)
| Glen Saville,  Gary Ervin (3)
| WIN Entertainment Centre  3,302
| 1–0
|- style="background-color:#bbffbb;"
| 2
| 22 October
| Townsville
| W 71-70
| Gary Ervin (25)
| Oscar Forman (7)
| Glen Saville (4)
| WIN Entertainment Centre  3,367
| 2-0
|- style="background-color:#ffcccc;"
| 3
| 29 October
| @ Perth
| L 84-87
| Oscar Forman (23)
| Larry Davidson (9)
| Glen Saville,  Gary Ervin,  Larry Davidson (4)
| Challenge Stadium  4,200
| 2-1
|- style="background-color:#bbffbb;"
| 4
| 31 October
| @ Adelaide
| W 96-82
| Gary Ervin (26)
| Larry Davidson (17)
| Gary Ervin (13)
| Adelaide Arena  4,519
| 3-1

|- style="background-color:#bbffbb;"
| 5
| 7 November
| @ Melbourne
| W 86-82
| Oscar Forman (21)
| Oscar Forman (9)
| Glen Saville (10)
| State Netball and Hockey Centre  2,821
| 4-1
|- style="background-color:#bbffbb;"
| 6
| 14 November
| Melbourne
| W 93-82
| Gary Ervin (26)
| Oscar Forman (9)
| Gary Ervin (7)
| WIN Entertainment Centre  3,537
| 5-1
|- style="background-color:#bbffbb;"
| 7
| 19 November
| @ New Zealand
| W 73-57
| Oscar Forman (21)
| Oscar Forman,  Glen Saville (11)
| Glen Saville (9)
| North Shore Events Centre  TBA
| 6-1
|- style="background-color:#bbffbb;"
| 8
| 26 November
| Sydney
| W 89-72
| Gary Ervin (31)
| Larry Davidson (9)
| Glen Saville (6)
| WIN Entertainment Centre  4,357
| 7-1

|- style="background-color:#ffcccc;"
| 9
| 4 December
| @ Cairns
| L 62-80
| Gary Ervin (21)
| Oscar Forman (8)
| Mat Campbell, Glen Saville (3)
| Cairns Convention Centre  4,625
| 7-2
|- style="background-color:#bbffbb;"
| 10
| 10 December
| Adelaide
| W 81-79
| Gary Ervin (31) 
| Larry Davidson (10)
| Gary Ervin (6)
| WIN Entertainment Centre  
| 8-2
|- style="background-color:#bbffbb;"
| 11
| 12 December
| @ Sydney
| W 95-80
| Tim Coenraad (24)
| Tim Coenraad,  Larry Davidson (6)
| Glen Saville (7)
| The Kingdome  
| 9-2
|- style="background-color:#ffcccc;"
| 12
| 17 December
| New Zealand
| L 85-89
| Gary Ervin (31) 
| Larry Davidson (13)
| Gary Ervin (7)
| WIN Entertainment Centre  
| 9-3
|- style="background-color:#ffcccc;"
| 13
| 23 December
| Gold Coast
| L 70-72
| Gary Ervin,  Oscar Forman (18) 
| Larry Davidson (10)
| Gary Ervin (4)
| WIN Entertainment Centre 
| 9-4
|- style="background-color:#ffcccc;"
| 14
| 31 December
| @ Adelaide
| L 83-98
| Oscar Forman (17)
| Tyson Demos,  Larry Davidson,  Mat Campbell,  David Gruber (4)
| Mat Campbell (5)
| Adelaide Arena 
| 9-5

|- style="background-color:#ffcccc;"
| 15
| 9 January
| @ Gold Coast
| L 86-87
| Gary Ervin (22)
| Larry Davidson (9)
| Larry Davidson (4)
| The Furnace  
| 9-6
|- style="background-color:#ffcccc;"
| 16
| 14 January
| @ Perth
| W 58-92
| Tim Coenraad (22) 
| Tim Coenraad,  Rhys Martin (7)
| Rhys Martin (6)
| Challenge Stadium  
| 9-7
|- style="background-color:#ffcccc;"
| 17
| 21 January
| @ Sydney
| W 71-81
| Gary Ervin (22)
| Oscar Forman (11)
| Tyson Demos,  Rhys Martin (3)
| The Kingdome  
| 9-8
|- style="background-color:#ffcccc"
| 18
| 28 January
| Cairns
| L 86-97
| Tyson Demos,  Tim Coenraad (16) 
| Larry Davidson (8)
| Gary Ervin,  Oscar Forman (4)
| WIN Entertainment Centre  
| 9-9

|- style="background-color:#ffcccc"
| 19
| 3 February
| @ New Zealand
| L 76-80
| Gary Ervin (21)
| Larry Davidson (10)
| Oscar Forman,  Rhys Martin (2)
| North Shore Events Centre  
| 9-10
|- style="background-color:#ffcccc"
| 20
| 6 February
| @ Melbourne
| L 72-93
| Mat Campbell (13)
| Larry Davidson (7)
| Mat Campbell (4)
| SNHC 
| 9-11
|- style="background-color:#ccffcc"
| 21
| 12 February
| Perth Wildcats
| W 105-73
|
|
|
| WIN Entertainment Centre  3,431
| 10-11
|- style="background-color:#ffcccc"
| 22
| 18 February
| @ Townsville
| L 75-65
|
|
|
| The Swamp  3,586
| 10-12
|- style="background-color:#ccffcc"
| 23
| 27 February
| New Zealand
| W 104-81
|
|
|
| WIN Entertainment Centre  3,112
| 11-12

|- style="background-color:#ccffcc"
| 24
| 5 March
| Townsville
| W 87–77
|
|
|
| WIN Entertainment Centre  3,112
| 12–12

|- style="background-color:#ccffcc"
| 25
| 11 March
| @ Gold Coast
| W 68–80
|
|
|
| Gold Coast Convention Centre  3,518
| 13–12

|- style="background-color:#ccffcc"
| 26
| 12 March
| Adelaide
| W 87–60
|
|
|
| WIN Entertainment Centre  3,318
| 14–12

|- style="background-color:#ffcccc"
| 27
| 19 March
| Cairns
| L 67–68
|
|
|
| WIN Entertainment Centre  3,780
| 14–13

|- style="background-color:#ccffcc"
| 28
| 27 March
| Sydney
| W 86–70
|
|
|
| WIN Entertainment Centre  3,867
| 15–13

Player statistics

Regular season

Awards

Player of the Week
 Week 2 – Gary Ervin
 Week 6 – Oscar Forman
 Week 24 - Gary Ervin

Player of the Month
 October – Gary Ervin
 November – Gary Ervin

Coach of the Month
 October – Gordie McLeod 
 November – Gordie McLeod

See also
2010-11 NBL season

References

External links
Official Site of the Hawks

Wollongong
Illawarra Hawks seasons

es:Wollongong Hawks
fr:Wollongong Hawks
it:Wollongong Hawks
ja:ウロンゴン・ホークス